Robert Filmer was a political theorist.

Robert Filmer is also the name of:

Sir Robert Filmer, 1st Baronet, of the Filmer baronets, father of Edward Filmer
Sir Robert Filmer, 2nd Baronet (1648–1720), of the Filmer baronets
Sir Robert Marcus Filmer, 10th Baronet (1878–1916), of the Filmer baronets